Karen Hilton MBE and Marcus Hilton MBE are a British dance couple, noted for competing in the disciplines of Ballroom and Latin American at both amateur and professional level.  They have held a number of championship titles, including the World Professional Ballroom Championship, which they have won nine times representing Great Britain.  They are patrons of the International Dance Teachers Association and both work as dance teachers, lecturers and competition judges.

Dance career

The Hiltons first competed together in amateur dance competitions in 1978, achieving Championship titles in the UK for Latin American dance.  They also competed in international events, representing Great Britain.  In 1980, they took part in the United Kingdom Open Championship, qualifying for the World Amateur Latin American Championships in West Germany.  They represented England at the event, achieving 5th place.  They later achieved Championship wins in the European and World Amateur 10 Dance Championships.

The Hiltons became a professional dance couple in 1983, winning their first professional title at the British Rising Star Championship.  The couple were married in 1986 and continued to dance professionally whilst giving demonstrations, teaching, lecturing and judging.  In June 1997, both Karen and Marcus were awarded Membership of the Order of the British Empire in the Queen's Birthday Honours List.  They competed professionally until their retirement in 1998, winning numerous Championship titles.

Titles and awards

The following is a complete list of titles and awards won by the Hiltons:

1981-1983 (Amateur)
 1981 - World Amateur 10 Dance Champions
 1982 - World Amateur 10 Dance Champions
 1982 - World Amateur Latin Champions
 1982 - British Open Amateur Latin Champions (Blackpool)
 1983 - World Amateur Latin Champions
 1983 - British Open Amateur Latin Champions (Blackpool)

1984 (Professional)
 British Rising Star Champions

1986
 World Professional 10 Dance Champions
 European Professional 10 Dance Champions
 World Ballroom Championship - 3rd Place

1989
 World Professional Ballroom Segue Champions
 BDF Award
 USA Open Championship - Winners

1990
 World Ballroom Champions
 European Ballroom Champions
 British Ballroom Champions
 British Open Championship - Winners
 USA Open Championship - Winners
 Norway Open Championship - Winners
 World Cup - Winners

1991
 World Ballroom Champions
 International Champions
 United Kingdom Champions
 USA Open - Winners

1992
 World Champions
 International Champions
 United Kingdom Champions
 British Ballroom Champions
 USA Open - Winners
 BDF Award - Winners

1993
 World Champions
 International Champions
 European Ballroom Champions
 United Kingdom Champions
 German Open - Winners
 USA Open - Winners
 World Trophy - Winners
 World Grand Prix - Winners
 World Classic Show Dance - Winners
 Carl Alan Award Winners
 BDF Award Winners

1994
 World Champions
 International Champions
 European Ballroom Champions
 British Ballroom Champions
 United Kingdom Champions
 USA Open - Winners
 Japanese Open - Winners
 World Classic Show Dance - Winners
 Super World Cup - Winners
 Woman of the Year Rochdale - Karen

1995
 World Champions
 International Champions
 British Ballroom Champions
 United Kingdom Champions
 European Ballroom Champions
 USA Open - winners
 Carl Alan Award
 BDF Award Winners
 Man of the Year Rochdale - Marcus

1996
 World Champions
 International Champions
 British Ballroom Champions
 United Kingdom Champions
 European Ballroom Champions
 USA Open - winners
 Japanese Open - Winners
 BDF Award Winners

1997
 World Champions
 International Champions
 British Ballroom Champions
 United Kingdom Champions
 German Open - Winners
 USA Open - Winners
 UK Open - Winners
 British Open - Winners
 US Open - Winners
 Both Awarded the MBE

1998
 World Champions
 British Ballroom Champions
 United Kingdom Champions
 International Champions
 Carl Alan Award
 BDF Award Winners

References

British ballroom dancers
English dancers
Married couples
Members of the Order of the British Empire
Living people
Year of birth missing (living people)